Norfenfluramine, or 3-trifluoromethylamphetamine, is a never-marketed drug of the amphetamine family that behaves as a serotonin and norepinephrine releasing agent and potent 5-HT2A, 5-HT2B, and 5-HT2C agonist. The action of norfenfluramine on 5-HT2B receptors on heart valves leads to a characteristic pattern of heart failure following proliferation of cardiac fibroblasts on the tricuspid valve, known as cardiac fibrosis. This side effect led to the withdrawal of fenfluramine as an anorectic agent worldwide, and to the withdrawal of benfluorex in Europe, as both fenfluramine and benfluorex form norfenfluramine as an active metabolite.  It is a human TAAR1 agonist.

See also
 Fenfluramine
 Benfluorex
 Norfenfluramine is the precursor to flucetorex

References

5-HT2B agonists
Substituted amphetamines
Anorectics
Trifluoromethyl compounds
Serotonin receptor agonists
Serotonin-norepinephrine releasing agents
TAAR1 agonists
Human drug metabolites